Little Ripper is a drone that can be deployed by surf lifesavers to locate and assist swimmers in trouble by providing aerial observation and liferafts.  It was developed by Kevin Weldon after watching a UAV search for survivors in the aftermath of Hurricane Katrina.

In early 2018, it was involved in a rescue off Lennox Head where it dropped an inflatable life-raft to two tired swimmers, the first rescue by a drone.

References

Unmanned aerial vehicles of Australia